The 2007 Twenty20 Cup was the fifth edition of the Twenty20 Cup tournament, which ran between 22 June and 4 August 2007, and saw the Kent Spitfires win the tournament for the first time, defeating Gloucestershire Gladiators in the final by 4 wickets. The first televised match of the year was between the defending champions Leicestershire Foxes and the Yorkshire Phoenix.

The quarter finals were held on 17 and 18 July 2007, with Finals Day taking place on 4 August 2007 at Edgbaston.

Regular Season Games

June Fixtures
Winning team in bold

22 June

23 June

24 June

25 June

26 June

27 June

28 June

29 June

30 June

July Fixtures
Winning team in bold

1 July

2 July

3 July

4 July

5 July

6 July

Regular season standings

Quarter finals
Winning team in bold

Finals Day

Semi finals
Winning team in bold

Final

References

Twenty20 Cup
Twenty20 Cup 2007